Mahfooz Yar Khan is a Pakistani politician who had been a Member of the Provincial Assembly of Sindh, from June 2016 to May 2018.

Early life and education
He was born on 19 January 1950 in Uttar Pradesh, India.

He has a degree of Bachelors of Arts, a degree of Master of Arts and a degree of Bachelor of Laws, all from Karachi University.

He also has a degree of Master of Laws and a degree of Doctor of Philosophy.

Political career

He was elected to the Provincial Assembly of Sindh as a candidate of Mutahida Quami Movement from Constituency PS-106 KARACHI-XVIII in by-polls held in June 2016.

References

Living people
Sindh MPAs 2013–2018
1950 births
Muttahida Qaumi Movement politicians